Gertjan de Mets (born 2 April 1987) is a retired Belgian football player who played as a midfielder. He is currently a youth coach and video analyst for K.A.A. Gent.

Coaching career
de Mets retired at the end of the 2018-19 season and was hired by Gent as manager of the U12 team and as a video analyst for the first team.

References

External links

Guardian Football

1987 births
Living people
Belgian footballers
Club Brugge KV players
K.V. Kortrijk players
S.V. Zulte Waregem players
K Beerschot VA players
Association football midfielders
Belgian Pro League players
Challenger Pro League players
Footballers from Bruges
Association football coaches